Park Middle School may refer to one of several schools in the United States:

Park Middle School (Lincoln, Nebraska) in Lincoln, Nebraska
Scotch Plains-Fanwood Regional School District in Scotch Plains, New Jersey
 Park Middle School, part of the Antioch Unified School District in Antioch, California.